Jim Wells may refer to:

People

 James B. Wells Jr. (1850–1923), South Texas judge and political boss
 Jim Wells (baseball) (born 1955), American collegiate baseball coach
 Jim Wells (politician) (born 1957), Northern Irish politician
 Jim L. Wells, radio producer
 Jim Wells (speedway rider), motorcycle speedway rider

Places
 Jim Wells County, Texas

See also
James Wells (disambiguation)